Slovo may refer to:
Slovo o plŭku Igorevě, East Slavic name for The Tale of Igor's Campaign
 Joe Slovo, South African politician
 Joe Slovo (Cape Town), a settlement
 Slovo (album), by Arkona
 Slovo (band) a British electronic band
 Slovo (UK journal), an academic journal of the UCL School of Slavonic and East European Studies (SSEES).
 Slovo (Swedish journal), an academic journal of the Department of Modern Languages at Uppsala University).